School District 69 Qualicum is a school district on central Vancouver Island in British Columbia. This includes the major centres of Parksville and Qualicum Beach.

Schools

See also
List of school districts in British Columbia

References

69
Parksville, British Columbia